Bhola-1 is a constituency represented in the Jatiya Sangsad (National Parliament) of Bangladesh since 2014 by Tofail Ahmed of the Awami League.

Boundaries 
The constituency encompasses Bhola Sadar Upazila.

History 
The constituency was created in 1984 from the Bakerganj-1 constituency when the former Bakerganj District was split into four districts: Bhola, Bakerganj, Jhalokati, and Pirojpur.

Members of Parliament 
Key

Elections

Elections in the 2010s 
Tofail Ahmed was elected unopposed in the 2014 general election after opposition parties withdrew their candidacies in a boycott of the election.

Elections in the 2000s

Elections in the 1990s 
Tofail Ahmed stood for two seats in the June 1996 general election: Bhola-1 and Bhola-2. After winning both, he chose to represent the latter and quit the former, triggering a by-election. The High Court, however, stayed the by-election, and the seat remained vacant for the entire tenure of the seventh parliament.

References

External links
 

Parliamentary constituencies in Bangladesh
Bhola District